Fabrizio Biava (born 25 August 1983) is an Italian footballer.

Football career
Biava started his career at Internazionale. He won the Primavera Champions in 2001–02. In summer 2003, He was promoted to first team along with Alex Cordaz. But he just made a few appearances in friendly matches and played for Primavera U20 team as overage player.

In July 2004, he was on loan to Ternana, (with Mathieu Moreau), where he just made one appearance.

He returned to Inter in January 2005, and made his Inter debut against A.S. Roma in Coppa Italia final.

He was loaned to Lucchese along with Mathieu Moreau in July 2005, but in the last days of transfer windows, he changed to join Acireale along with Alex Cordaz and Devis Nossa.

In July 2006, he moved to Pro Patria, along with Dino Marino, Nicolas Giani.

In August 2007, he left for Pizzighettone on loan.

He left for Serie D side Spezia in 2008-09 season, where he won promotion back to professional football.

In 2009-10 season, he left for Fanfulla.

Honours and awards
Coppa Italia: 2005

References

External links
Inter Archive
 
calciatori.com link|date=January 2018 |bot=InternetArchiveBot |fix-attempted=yes }}

1983 births
Living people
People from Melzo
Italian footballers
Serie B players
Inter Milan players
Ternana Calcio players
A.S. Pizzighettone players
Spezia Calcio players
S.S.D. Lucchese 1905 players
Aurora Pro Patria 1919 players
Association football midfielders
A.S.D. Fanfulla players
Footballers from Lombardy
Sportspeople from the Metropolitan City of Milan